The Mahāratnakūṭa Sūtra (Sanskrit; , Tib. dam-chos dkon-mchog-brtsegs-pa) is an ancient collection of Mahāyāna Buddhist sūtras. It is also known simply as Ratnakūṭa Sūtra, literally the Sutra of the Heap of Jewels in Sanskrit (kūṭa means ‘accumulation’ or ‘heap’).

Overview
The Mahāratnakūṭa Sūtra contains 49 texts of varying length, which are termed "assemblies" by tradition. This collection includes the Śrīmālādevī Siṃhanāda Sūtra, the Longer Sukhāvatī-vyūha Sutra, the Akṣobhya-vyūha Sūtra, a long text called the Bodhisattvapiṭaka, and others.  Part of this texts was brought to China and translated by Bodhiruci in the 8th century.  Bodhiruci translated some of the texts, and included others which had been previously translated. This later Bodhiruci should not be confused with another Bodhiruci who was the translator of the commentary on Ten Stages Sutra.

The Ratnakūṭa collection totals 49 Mahāyāna sūtras, divided into 120 fascicles in the Chinese translation. Garma Chang, who is listed as General Editor of a volume of  select sūtras from the Mahāratnakūṭa translated from Chinese into English, (see below, Further Reading, Garma C.C. Chang, (1983). A Treasury of Mahāyāna Sūtras: Selections from the Mahāratnakūṭa Sūtra. Title Page) summarizes the breadth and variety of texts contained in this collection:

In the Taishō Tripiṭaka in volumes 11 and 12a, the Mahāratnakūṭa is the text numbered 310, and texts numbered 311 through 373 are various other translations of some of the sutras contained in the Mahāratnakūṭa.

List of sutras
The 49 sutras found in this collection are as follows:

Trisaṁvara-nirdeśa 
Anantamukha-pariśodhana-nirdeśa 
Tathāgatācintya-guhya-nirdeśa
Svapna-nirdeśa 
Sukhāvatī-vyūha 
Akṣobhya-tathāgatasya-vyūha 
Varma-vyūha-nirdeśa 
Dharmadhātu-prakṛty-asambheda-nirdeśa 
Daśadharmaka
Samantamukha-parivarta
Raśmisamantamukta-nirdeśa
Bodhisattva-piṭaka
Āyuṣman-nanda-garbhāvakrānti-nirdeśa
Nanda-garbhāvakrānti-nirdeśa
Mañjuśrī-buddhakṣetra-guṇa-vyūha
Pitāputrasamāgama
Pūrṇa-paripṛcchā
Rāṣṭrapāla-paripṛcchā
Gṛhapaty-Ugra-paripṛcchā
Vidyutprāpta-paripṛcchā
Bhadramāyākāra-vyākaraṇa
Mahā-prātihārya-nirdeśa
Maitreya-mahāsiṁhanāda
Upāli-paripṛcchā
Adhyāśaya-saṁcodana
Subāhu-paripṛcchā
Surata-paripṛcchā
Vīradatta-gṛhapati-paripṛcchā
Udayanavatsarāja-paripṛcchā
Sumatidārikā-paripṛcchā
Gaṅgottarā-paripṛcchā
Aśokadatta-vyākaraṇa
Vimaladattā-paripṛcchā
Guṇaratnasaṁkusumita-paripṛcchā
Acintyabuddhaviṣaya-nirdeśa
Susthitamati-devaputra-paripṛcchā
Siṁha-paripṛcchā
Upāyakauśalya-jñānottara-bodhisattva-paripṛcchā
Bhadrapāla-śreṣṭhi-paripṛcchā
Dārikā-vimalaśuddha-paripṛcchā
Maitreya-paripṛcchā-dharmāṣṭaka
Maitreya-paripṛcchā
Kāśyapa-parivarta
Ratnarāśi
Akṣayamati-paripṛcchā
Saptaśatikā-nāma-prajñāpāramitā
Ratnacūḍa-paripṛcchā
Śrīmālā-devī-siṁhanāda
Ṛṣivyāsa-paripṛcchā

History
According to the Nikāyasaṅgraha (a Theravādin text), the Ratnakūṭa Sūtra was composed by the "Andhakas", meaning the Mahāsāṃghika Caitika schools of the Āndhra region. The texts of the sutra seem to have been collected over a number of centuries, and their varying subject matter is suggestive of historical transitions between major eras of Buddhist thought. The collection may have developed from a "Bodhisattva pitaka" attributed to some of the early Mahayana schools.

References

Further reading
 Garma C.C. Chang, trans. (1983). A Treasury of Mahāyāna Sūtras: Selections from the Mahāratnakūṭa Sūtra.  
Pederson, K. Priscilla (1980). "Notes on the Ratnakūṭa Collection" in Journal of the International Association of Buddhist Studies 3 (2), 60-66

External links
 

Mahayana sutras
Vaipulya sutras